The 2014 World Team Table Tennis Championships were held in Tokyo from 28 April to 5 May 2014. The Championships was staged in Japan for the seventh time and was the 52nd edition of the team competition.

The decision was announced by ITTF in May 2011, after several sporting events including the 2011 World Figure Skating Championships were shifted from Japan due to the Tōhoku earthquake and the following Fukushima Daiichi nuclear disaster.

Seeding
The first division (Championship Division) comprised 24 teams. The top eighteen teams of the first division and the top two teams of the second division at the 2012 World Team Championships were guaranteed a place in the competition. The other four spots were based on the latest ITTF Computer World Team Ranking before the Championships.

Medal summary

Events

Medal table

Results

Men's team

Women's team

References

External links

ITTF.com

 
2014
World Table Tennis Championships
World Table Tennis Championships
2014 World Table Tennis Championships
2014 World Table Tennis Championships
World Team Table Tennis Championships 
World Team Table Tennis Championships 
2014 in Tokyo